Beverly P. Mortensen is a musician, composer, and scholar of ancient Jewish religion at Northwestern University. In 2006, she published the book The Priesthood in Targum Pseudo-Jonathan: Renewing the Profession (Studies in Aramaic Interpretation of Scripture 4), in which she strongly argues her thesis, that Targum Pseudo-Jonathan is a late 4th-century CE work and is meant as a manual for kohanim, Jewish priests.

A scholar of ancient Judaism, the Hebrew Bible, and contemporary religious thought, Mortensen has also published a book Oh Priests, showing the priest-centered authorship and readership of Targum Pseudo-Jonathan. She will also soon publish Examining Your Childhood Religion, a comparison of biblical religions with the Bible, and identification of their dissonance with the modern world. Published articles concern Targums, Aramaic translations of the Hebrew Bible.

Specific teaching interests include Temple cult and Hebrew Bible, Dead Sea Scrolls and New Age thought. Her courses include Finding God, Dead Sea Scrolls, Moses and David: Tabernacle and Temple, and Wisdom Literature. She is director of the Village Singers, a choral group in Glencoe, Illinois.

Life
Mortensen received her BFA in Music and Music Education from Carnegie Mellon University, in 1961. Mortensen taught music in the Pittsburgh public schools for two years, directing several choruses there. For 25 years she directed the St. Athanasius church choir in Evanston, Illinois.

Mortensen is also a prolific composer, who has written hymns, anthems, songs, Masses, and oratorios. She has also directed community presentations of Broadway shows. She wrote and directed original musicals for schools and community groups in the Chicago area. She was director of the Starlight Chorale in the Wallace Bowl at Gillson Park in Wilmette, Illinois. In the early 1970s, she was a professional folk singer.

Later, she did a PhD program in early Judaism at Northwestern University, earning her degree in 1995. She teaches there, as an adjunct professor, classes on the Hebrew Bible and Contemporary Religion. She also edits the twice yearly bibliography Newsletter for Targumic and Cognate Studies.

Living people
Year of birth missing (living people)
Carnegie Mellon University College of Fine Arts alumni
Northwestern University alumni
American theologians
American religion academics